Recovery is an unincorporated community in Decatur County, Georgia, United States.

History
The community's name originates from Camp Recovery, established during the First Seminole Indian War as a hospital base to which the sick soldiers from Fort Scott were sent to recover. Camp Recovery was occupied for only two months, but the suffering of the men 
there produced a lasting impact on the area. The story of the poor soldiers and their dying days at the camp is well known by local 
residents.  A Federal Monument on the site marks the burial place of U.S. officers and soldiers who died during the hostilities in the Flint and Chattahoochee River Counties 1817–1821. A post office called Recovery was established in 1885, and remained in operation until 1948.

References

http://www.exploresouthernhistory.com/camprecovery1.html

Unincorporated communities in Decatur County, Georgia
Unincorporated communities in Georgia (U.S. state)